Mongkolchai Kwaitonggym (มงคลชัย ควายทองยิม) is a Thai Muay Thai fighter.

Titles and accomplishments

 2009 Channel 7 Boxing Stadium 108 lbs Champion
 2010 Lumpinee Stadium 108 lbs Champion
 2018 Channel 7 Stadium 126 lbs Champion
 2019 Samui Festival Featherweight Champion

Fight record

|-  style="background:#fbb;"
| 2020-12-20|| Loss||align=left| Dieselnoi Sor.Damnern || Channel 7 Boxing Stadium || Bangkok, Thailand || Decision || 5 || 3:00
|-  style="background:#cfc;"
| 2020-09-19|| Win||align=left| Dieselnoi Sor.Damnern || SorJor.Lekmuangnon + Sor.Chokmeechai, Or.Tor.Gor 3 Stadium || Nonthaburi, Thailand || Decision || 5 || 3:00
|-  style="background:#fbb;"
| 2019-11-14|| Loss||align=left| Chalam Parunchai || Rajadamnern Stadium || Bangkok, Thailand || Decision || 5 || 3:00
|-  style="background:#cfc;"
| 2019-09-13|| Win||align=left| Klasuek Phetjinda || Samui Festival || Ko Samui, Thailand || Decision || 5 || 3:00
|- 
! style=background:white colspan=9 |
|-  style="background:#fbb;"
| 2019-04-07|| Loss||align=left| Klasuek Phetjinda ||  Channel 7 Boxing Stadium || Bangkok, Thailand || KO || 4 || 
|- 
! style=background:white colspan=9 |
|-  style="background:#fbb;"
| 2019-01-10|| Loss||align=left| Lamnamoonlek Or.Atchariya || Rajadamnern Stadium || Bangkok, Thailand || Decision || 5 || 3:00
|-  style="background:#fbb;"
| 2018-09-13|| Loss ||align=left| Rungkit Wor.Sanprapai  || Rajadamnern Stadium  || Bangkok, Thailand || TKO || 3 || 2:55
|-  style="background:#c5d2ea;"
| 2018-08-09|| Draw ||align=left| Petchdam Petchyindee Academy || Rajadamnern Stadium || Bangkok, Thailand || Decision || 5 || 3:00
|-  style="background:#cfc;"
| 2018-06-25|| Win||align=left| Chalam Parunchai || Birthday Nayok-A-Thasala + Kiatpetch || Nakhon Si Thammarat Province, Thailand || Decision || 5 || 3:00
|-  style="background:#cfc;"
| 2018-05-11|| Win||align=left| Siwagon Kiatjaroenchai || Kiatpetch Super Fight + Sor.Dechapan || Satun Province, Thailand || Decision || 5 || 3:00
|-  style="background:#cfc;"
| 2018-03-28|| Win||align=left| Sing Parunchai || WanParunchai + Poonseua Sanjorn || Nakhon Si Thammarat Province, Thailand || Decision || 5 || 3:00
|-  style="background:#cfc;"
| 2018-02-04|| Win||align=left| Siwagon Kiatjaroenchai || Channel 7 Boxing Stadium || Bangkok, Thailand || Decision || 5 || 3:00 
|- 
! style=background:white colspan=9 |
|-  style="background:#fbb;"
| 2017-09-09|| Loss||align=left| Tawanchai PK Saenchaimuaythaigym || Lumpinee Stadium || Bangkok, Thailand || Decision || 5 || 3:00
|-  style="background:#cfc;"
| 2017-08-06|| Win||align=left| Tawanchai PK Saenchaimuaythaigym || Channel 7 Boxing Stadium || Bangkok, Thailand || Decision || 5 || 3:00
|-  style="background:#cfc;"
| 2017-07-01|| Win||align=left| Senkeng Kelasport || Lumpinee Stadium || Bangkok, Thailand || Decision || 5 || 3:00
|-  style="background:#fbb;"
| 2017-01-26|| Loss||align=left| Phetwason Or.Daokrajai || Rajadamnern Stadium || Bangkok, Thailand || Decision || 5 || 3:00
|-  style="background:#cfc;"
| 2016-08-07|| Win||align=left| Prakaipetch Nitisamui  || Komchadluek Stadium || Nonthaburi, Thailand || Decision || 5 || 3:00
|-  style="background:#fbb;"
| 2015-10-30|| Loss||align=left| Suakim PK Saenchaimuaythaigym  || Lumpinee Stadium || Bangkok, Thailand || KO || 3 ||
|-  style="background:#cfc;"
| 2015-06-28|| Win||align=left| Suakim PK Saenchaimuaythaigym  || Channel 7 Boxing Stadium || Bangkok, Thailand || Decision || 5 || 3:00
|- 
! style=background:white colspan=9 |
|-  style="background:#cfc;"
| 2015-05-10|| Win||align=left| Kongkiat Thor.Pran49  || Channel 7 Boxing Stadium || Bangkok, Thailand || Decision || 5 || 3:00
|-  style="background:#fbb;"
| 2013-07-09|| Loss||align=left| Sangmanee Sor Tienpo|| Lumpinee Stadium || Bangkok, Thailand || KO (Left Body Knee)|| 4 || 3:00
|-  style="background:#cfc;"
| 2013-06-04|| Win||align=left| Suakim PK Saenchaimuaythaigym || Lumpinee Stadium || Bangkok, Thailand || Decision || 5 || 3:00
|-  style="background:#fbb;"
| 2013-02-07 || Loss||align=left| Nong-O Gaiyanghadao || Rajadamnern Stadium|| Bangkok, Thailand || TKO || 5 ||
|-  style="background:#fbb;"
| 2013-02-05 || Loss||align=left| Phet Utong Or. Kwanmuang || Lumpinee Stadium || Bangkok, Thailand || Decision || 5 || 3:00
|-  style="background:#cfc;"
| 2012-12-14 ||Win||align=left| Tuan Kor Kumpanart || Lumpinee Stadium || Bangkok, Thailand || Decision || 5 || 3:00
|-  style="background:#fbb;"
| 2012-12-07 ||Loss||align=left| Sagetdao Petpayathai || Lumpinee Stadium || Bangkok, Thailand || Decision || 5 || 3:00
|-  style="background:#cfc;"
| 2012-09-12|| Win||align=left|  Parnphet Chor.NaPatalung || Rajadamnern Stadium || Bangkok, Thailand || Decision  || 5 || 3:00
|-  style="background:#fbb;"
| 2012-08-14 || Loss||align=left| Kaotam Lookprabaht || Lumpinee Stadium || Bangkok, Thailand || TKO (Low Kick)||  ||
|-  style="background:#fbb;"
| 2012-06-22|| Loss||align=left| Kaotam Lookprabaht || Lumpinee Stadium || Bangkok, Thailand || Decision || 5 || 3:00
|-  style="background:#fbb;"
| 2012-05-17|| Loss ||align=left| Pakorn PKSaenchaimuaythaigym || Rajadamnern Stadium || Bangkok, Thailand || Decision || 5 || 3:00
|-  style="background:#fbb;"
| 2012-03-30 || Win ||align=left| Phetmorakot Petchyindee Academy || Lumpinee Stadium || Bangkok, Thailand || Decision || 5 || 3:00
|-  style="background:#cfc;"
| 2012-02-28|| Win||align=left| Singtongnoi Por.Telakun || Lumpinee Stadium || Bangkok, Thailand || TKO (Doctor Stoppage)||  ||
|-  style="background:#cfc;"
| 2012-01-29|| Win||align=left| Wanchalong PK.Saenchai || Channel 7 Boxing Stadium || Bangkok, Thailand || Decision  || 5 || 3:00
|-  style="background:#cfc;"
| 2011-12-09 || Win ||align=left| Phetmorakot Petchyindee Academy || Lumpinee Stadium || Bangkok, Thailand || Decision || 5 || 3:00
|-  style="background:#fbb;"
| 2011-08-04 || Loss||align=left| Nong-O Gaiyanghadao || Toyota Vigo Marathon, Channel 7 Boxing Stadium || Bangkok, Thailand || Decision || 3 || 3:00
|-  style="background:#cfc;"
| 2011-06-19 || Win||align=left| Mankao Chor.Chanmanee || Channel 7 Boxing Stadium  || Bangkok, Thailand || Decision  || 5 || 3:00
|-  style="background:#cfc;"
| 2011-03-17 || Win||align=left| Palangpol Chuwattana || Rajadamnern Stadium  || Bangkok, Thailand || Decision  || 5 || 3:00
|-  style="background:#fbb;"
| 2010-11-12 || Loss||align=left| Wirachai Wor.Wiwattananon || Lumpinee Stadium  || Bangkok, Thailand || KO || 1 ||
|-  style="background:#cfc;"
| 2010-09-24|| Win||align=left| Wanchalong PK.Saenchai || Lumpinee Stadium || Bangkok, Thailand || Decision  || 5 || 3:00
|- 
! style=background:white colspan=9 |
|-  style="background:#cfc;"
| 2010-07-20|| Win||align=left| Wanchalong PK.Saenchai || Lumpinee Stadium || Bangkok, Thailand || Decision  || 5 || 3:00
|-  style="background:#fbb;"
| 2010-06-10 || Loss||align=left| Manasak Sitniwat ||  Rajadamnern Stadium || Bangkok, Thailand || TKO  || 3 ||
|-  style="background:#fbb;"
| 2010-05-07 || Loss||align=left| Jomthong Chuwattana || Suek Petchpiya, Lumpinee Stadium || Bangkok, Thailand || KO (Punch) || 4 ||
|-  style="background:#fbb;"
| 2010-02-26|| Loss||align=left| Wanchalong PK.Saenchai || Lumpinee Stadium || Bangkok, Thailand || TKO || 2 ||
|-  style="background:#cfc;"
| 2010-01-03|| Win||align=left| Monchailek Sor. Sommai || Channel 7 Boxing Stadium || Bangkok, Thailand || KO (Left Elbow)|| 3 ||
|-  style="background:#cfc;"
| 2009|| Win||align=left| Weerachai|| Lumpinee Stadium || Bangkok, Thailand || KO || 4 ||
|-  style="background:#cfc;"
| 2009-07-03|| Win||align=left| Pettawee Sor Kittichai|| Lumpinee Stadium || Bangkok, Thailand || Decision || 5 || 3:00
|-  style="background:#cfc;"
| 2009|| Win||align=left| Kusagonnoi Sitpetchubon || Channel 7 Boxing Stadium || Bangkok, Thailand || Decision  || 5 || 3:00
|- 
! style=background:white colspan=9 |
|-
| colspan=9 | Legend:

References

Mongkolchai Kwaitonggym
Living people
1992 births
Mongkolchai Kwaitonggym